XPAND 3D developed active-shutter 3D solutions for multiple purposes. The company was founded by Maria Costeira and Ami Dror in 2005 as X6D Limited. The company deployed over 15,000 cinemas worldwide.

XPAND 3D Cinema 
The XPAND cinema 3D systems can be both active or passive 3D system.

In passive 3D system, silver screen is used and polarized filters on both projector and 3D glasses send either left or right image to appropriate eye and thus creating stereoscopic image in viewer's brains.

Home use 
XPAND 3D glasses is the leading brand of 3D shutter glasses that can be used both in theaters and at home, for Digital cinema and 3DTV respectively.
With over 15k cinema screens worldwide, rolled-out within all retail stores from Best-buy to Amazon. In partnership with Panasonic, XPAND showcased the first 3D plasma TV at CES, was the technical partner of the Cannes Film Festival and was the recipient of many awards such as the Advanced Imaging Society: New Product Award and Best Technology Award.

Other applications of XPAND technology 
Other than its cinema and consumer electronic divisions, the 3D technologies developed by XPAND are used in education, medical (Amblyz glasses for the treatment of amblyopia) and professional environments.

Standardization of 3D protocols 
In August 2011 Panasonic, Samsung and Sony along with XPAND 3D announced an agreement called the "Full HD 3D Glasses Initiative" to develop a standard for 3D glasses on consumer products including televisions, computers and projectors, based on XPAND's technology.  Previously the companies had their own standards for 3D glasses and they were incompatible with each other.  The press release in the announcement said, "Universal glasses with the new IR/RF protocols will be made available in 2012, and are targeted to be backward compatible with 2011 3D active TVs."

See also 
3-D film
Stereoscopy
Digital cinema
Digital cinematography
Movie theater
Dolby 3D
RealD Cinema
MasterImage 3D

References

External links 
 XPAND 3D Web site
 Amblyz Product Web site

Motion picture film formats
3D imaging
XPAND 3D